The Ministry of Finance and Economic Development of Mauritius is a ministerial department found in the Cabinet of the government of the republic. It is considered as the most executive and important ministry in the cabinet after the Prime Minister's Office. The minister of finance is the most desirable position in the cabinet of the country except of the prime minister. Most of the times being the Deputy Prime Minister or any other senior member of the cabinet. Created along with the cabinet on 7 July 1968, since then it is found in the cabinet.

There are other departments falling under the aegis of the office such as economic development or empowerment. The department is not to be confused with the minister of economic planning as the minister of finance is the sole person in charge of the yearly budget for governmental and parliamentary works. The incumbent minister is Renganaden Padayachy who took office as from 12 November 2019.

Cabinet importance
The ministry of finance in the country is a very important department. It controls all the economic activities of the country as well as determines major price index of all the staples and all other commodities subsidies and taxes. It also determines the price of petrol and gas.

The Central Bank of Mauritius falls under the department and is accountable to the minister. Often considered as the post of the most eligible future prime minister, the minister of finance plays a rather important role in a government as it may decide if the economics policies brought forward by the political party in power are good or rather futile. This may result in a change in people's vote which may oust a government to a new party for a better economic management.

History
Many  Finance ministers have shaped the economy and brought about significant economic changes and  benefits to the country working under the lead and guidance of  their  prime ministers. Vishnu Lutchminaraidoo  was one of these Finance ministers from 1983 to 1991 in the cabinet of [Sir Anerood Jugnauth] where, he introduced ideas and policies developed by Jugnauth.

In some other cases like in 2000 to 2003, then finance minister Paul Bérenger who was also deputy prime minister, brought some of his own economic ideas and development which resulted in a constructive economic sector known as the BPO. Berenger became prime minister in 2003 and appointed Pravind Jugnauth as the head of finance and his deputy.

Pravind Jugnauth also held the office with his own ideas and initiatives without the need to constantly seek the lead of Prime Minister Beranger. This led to conflict between the two with Pravind as the weaker partner,  and the eventual dissolution of their coalition after they lost the 2005 general election to the  dynamic and emerging  Navin Chandra Ramgoolam.

In 2005, when  Navin Ramgoolam  came to power, he formed a new cabinet and appointed Rama Sithanen as namesake minister. Sithanen  introduced a series of economic policies and implementations such as free public transport to students and senior citizen and also the removal of Subsidies on O level and A level examinations in High School.

In 2010, after retaining power for the second successive mandate,  Ramgoolam formed a new government in alliance with the Militant Socialist Movement

The leader of the MSM, Pravind Jugnauth was  re-appointed as Vice Prime Minister and Minister of Finance. He also implemented his own policies and economic changes as per his party's program within the coalition. This led to tension especially with the Medpoint saga that led to the split of their alliance. 
In December 2014,  Ramgoolam lost the general election. Jugnauth Senior Sir, who defeated him,  formed a coalition government and  he went back to the glory days of the 1980s bringing back Vishnu Lutchmeenaraidoo as his saviour with the economy. He proclaimed the advent of the second economic miracle although Lutchmeenaraidoo has been a little shy about this.

Salary
The salary of the minister of finance is the same as a cabinet member unless, the office holder is also appointed as deputy prime minister or vice prime minister. The salary is as follows

Previous office holders
The person holding the office of Finance for the longest run remains Rama Sithanen who held the office for a run of 9 years. The person to hold the office for a shortest run is Vasant Bunwaree who held the office for 3 years.

See also
 List of company registers

References

Finance and Economic Development
Mauritius